Jack Randolph Thornell (born August 29, 1939) is an American photographer. He won a Pulitzer Prize for his photo of James Meredith after the activist was attacked and wounded by a sniper during his June 1966 March Against Fear in Mississippi.

Life
Thornell was born in Vicksburg, Mississippi. He served in the Army Signal Corps.  He worked as a photographer for the Jackson Daily News (1960–1964), and for decades for the Associated Press.

He married Carolyn Wilson in 1964; they had children Candice and Jay Randolph.

Awards
 1967 Pulitzer Prize for Photography

References

External links
"James Meredith", Martin Luther King and the Civil Rights Movement, 1966–1968, photos, Seattle Times, 2008
"Sketches of Winners of Pulitzer Prize Winners", The New York Times

1939 births
Living people
American photographers
Pulitzer Prize for Photography winners
People from Vicksburg, Mississippi
United States Army soldiers
Journalists from Mississippi